District 6 is an urban district (quận) of Ho Chi Minh City, the largest city in Vietnam. As of 2010, the district had a population of 253,474 and an area of 7 km². It is divided into 14 small subsets which are called wards (phường), numbered from Ward 1 to Ward 14.

Geographical location

District 6 borders District 11 and Tân Phú District to the north, District 5 to the east, District 8 to the south, and Bình Tân District to the west.

References

Districts of Ho Chi Minh City